88611 Teharonhiawako, or (88611) Teharonhiawako–Sawiskera as a binary, is a trans-Neptunian object and a member of the cold classical Kuiper belt, measuring about 220 km in diameter. It is a binary object, with a large companion named Sawiskera (formally designated (88611) Teharonhiawako I Sawiskera), which at 126 km in diameter is about two-thirds the size of its  primary.

Teharonhiawako was discovered on August 20, 2001, by the Deep Ecliptic Survey, and Sawiskera was identified a month later. The primary is named after Teharonhia꞉wako, a god of maize in the Iroquois creation myth, while the secondary is named after his evil twin brother Sawiskera. The objects were named in 2007.

Sawiskera's orbit has the following parameters: semi-major-axis—, period—, eccentricity— and inclination—(retrograde). The total system mass is about 2.4 kg.

References

External links 
 
 

088611
088611
Named minor planets
Binary trans-Neptunian objects
20010820